Dromore railway station was on the Banbridge, Lisburn and Belfast Junction Railway which ran from Knockmore Junction to Banbridge in Northern Ireland.

History
The station was opened on 13 July 1863 and closed on 30 April 1956.

It had a two-road goods shed, three sidings, two passenger platforms and a signal cabin.

Viaduct 

Immediately to the west of the station is Dromore Viaduct, which once carried trains across the River Lagan. At 74 ft tall and 7 arches long, it was the most noteworthy piece of engineering on the line.

The site today 
The station building is in use today as a children's nursery, whilst part of the platform and the former station yard are used by a mechanics. The viaduct still stands, and Dromore Town Park passes beneath it.

References 

Disused railway stations in County Down
Railway stations opened in 1863
Railway stations closed in 1956
1863 establishments in Ireland
1956 disestablishments in Northern Ireland
Railway stations in Northern Ireland opened in the 19th century